Thakhek (Lao language: ທ່າແຂກ), the capital of Khammouane Province, is a town in south-central Laos on the Mekong River. The Third Thai–Lao Friendship Bridge, linking Thakhek and Nakhon Phanom, Thailand, across the river, started in 2009 and was opened on 11 November 2011.

The city has many French colonial style official buildings, villas, and shops. In 1943, 85% of the population of Thakhek were Vietnamese due to the French policy of encouraging Vietnamese immigrants to Laos. Remnants of the abortive Thakhek-Tan Ap railway can be seen in and near the town. The railway would have run between Thakhek and Tân Ấp Railway Station, Quảng Bình Province, Vietnam through the Mụ Giạ Pass.

Western scientists first encountered the Laotian rock rat, kha nyou (Laonastes aenigmamus), in Thakhek's market.

Climate

References

External links 

 
 Destination: Khammouane Province

Laos–Thailand border crossings
Populated places in Khammouane Province
Populated places on the Mekong River
Provincial capitals in Laos